Pterolophia annulata is a species of beetle in the family Cerambycidae. It was described by Chevrolat in 1845, originally under the genus Coptops. It is known from Myanmar, China, Burma, Japan, Korea and Taiwan. It feeds on Piper nigrum.

References

annulata
Beetles described in 1845